Guttahalli is a small village in the Chintamani Taluk of Chikkaballapura district in Karnataka, India. It is situated about 12 kilometers from Chintamani.

Demographics 
According to the 2011 Indian Census, the village consists of 592 people. The town has a literacy rate of 64.87 percent which is lower than Karnataka's average of 75.36 percent.

References

Villages in Chikkaballapur district